Extempore is a live coding environment focused on real-time audiovisual software development. It is designed to accommodate the demands of cyber-physical computing. Extempore consists of two integrated languages, Scheme (with extensions) and Extempore Language. It uses the LLVM cross-language compiler to achieve performant digital signal processing and related low-level features, on-the-fly.

Relationship to Impromptu 

Extempore shares the use of Scheme syntax, real-time audiovisual emphasis and lead developer Andrew Sorensen with the older and related project Impromptu.
It runs under both Linux and Mac OS X. The bindings to Apple libraries are absent, but the environment can interface with dynamic libraries.

References

External links 
 

Digital art
Computer programming
Dynamically typed programming languages
Audio programming languages
Music software plugin architectures
Free music software
Electronic music software
Free audio software
Software synthesizers
MacOS multimedia software
Multimedia software for Linux
2011 software
Array programming languages
Live coding
Algorave